Red Margaret, Moonshiner is a 1913 American silent short romance film directed by Allan Dwan, starring Pauline Bush, Murdock MacQuarrie and Lon Chaney. This film, now considered lost, is a good example of Chaney's early attempts at creating bizarre makeups to enhance his roles, wearing a long beard and wild hair here as "Lon", the old moonshiner. The film's original working title was Warrington's Honor. Some sources say the film was later edited down to one reel and re-released theatrically as Moonshine Blood in 1916.

Plot
"Red" Margaret is the leader of a band of mountain moonshiners who have thwarted every attempt of the authorities to capture them. A government agent is sent up to the hills to assist in breaking up the gang, and Margaret falls in love with him. Lon, Margaret's moonshiner boyfriend, discovers the identity of the government agent and forces Margaret to write a letter which lures him to her cabin. Fearing for his safety, the girl notifies the authorities of the agent's danger. The police arrive and capture the moonshiners. Margaret's father is killed in the melee, and the agent is left behind, wounded. A deputy tries to take credit for the capture, but Margaret helps the injured agent get back to the sheriff's office and pretends that she is his prisoner. The agent is honored for his work and Margaret is sent off to prison, a happy woman.

Cast
 Pauline Bush as Red Margaret
 Murdock MacQuarrie as Government Agent
 James Neill as The Sheriff
 Lon Chaney as Lon, the old moonshiner

Reception
"Moving Picture World" stated: "Pauline Bush gives a good portrayal...It is a disagreeable part and a hard one, but she makes much of it. There are good mountain backgrounds." "Motion Picture News" stated: "Just why she is called 'Red' is not apparent. Pauline Bush interprets the part well, but there is no cause for the name except that it sounds melodramatic."

References

External links

1913 films
1910s romance films
1913 short films
American romance films
American silent short films
American black-and-white films
Films directed by Allan Dwan
Lost American films
Universal Pictures short films
1913 lost films
Lost romance films
1910s American films